The 1991 Western Illinois Leathernecks football team represented Western Illinois University as a member of the Gateway Collegiate Athletic Conference during the 1991 NCAA Division I-AA football season. They were led by second-year head coach Randy Ball and played their home games at Hanson Field. The Leathernecks finished the season with a 7–4–1 record overall and a 4–2 record in conference play. The team received an at-large bid to the NCAA Division I-AA Football Championship playoffs, where they lost to Marshall in the first round.

Schedule

References

Western Illinois
Western Illinois Leathernecks football seasons
Western Illinois Leathernecks football